Sir John Henry Lowther, 2nd Baronet (23 March 1793 – 23 June 1868) was a Tory MP in the British Parliament. He was the eldest son of Sir John Lowther, 1st Baronet, whom he succeeded on 11 May 1844.

He represented Cockermouth in 1816–1826, Wigtown Burghs in 1826–1831, Cockermouth again in 1831–1832, and York in 1835–1847. He then served as High Sheriff of Yorkshire for 1852–53.

He died unmarried, and was succeeded by his brother Charles Hugh Lowther.

References

Lowther pedigree 2

External links 
 

1793 births
1868 deaths
Baronets in the Baronetage of the United Kingdom
Conservative Party (UK) MPs for English constituencies
Members of the Parliament of the United Kingdom for Scottish constituencies
UK MPs 1826–1830
UK MPs 1830–1831
UK MPs 1835–1837
UK MPs 1837–1841
UK MPs 1841–1847
John
Tory MPs (pre-1834)
Scottish Tory MPs (pre-1912)
Cumbria MPs
High Sheriffs of Yorkshire